Dewey Stuit (pronounced stew-it, January 24, 1909 - January 9, 2008) was an American educational psychologist and academic administrator. He was the dean of the College of Arts at the University of Iowa from 1948 to 1977.

Early life
Stuit was born on January 24, 1909. He graduated from the University of Illinois, where he earned a bachelor's degree in 1931, a master's degree in 1932, and a PhD in educational psychology 1934.

Career
Stuit began his career at Carleton College.

Stuit joined the department of Psychology at the University of Iowa. He co-authored two books of educational psychology. When students first took the Graduate Record Examinations (GRE) as an experiment for the Carnegie Foundation for the Advancement of Teaching in 1940, Stuit analyzed the results for further development. He served as the dean of the College of Arts at the University of Iowa from 1948 to 1977.

Personal life and death
Stuit married Velma Elizabeth Pottorf in 1934.

Stuit died on January 9, 2008, in Iowa City. He bequeathed $3.2 million to the University of Iowa upon his death. He is the namesake of the Dewey Stuit Fund for Undergraduate Research at Iowa.

References

1909 births
2008 deaths
People from Whiteside County, Illinois
University of Illinois alumni
Carleton College faculty
University of Iowa faculty
20th-century American psychologists
American university and college faculty deans
20th-century American academics